Ranaghat Subdivision is an administrative subdivision located at Nadia district, in the state of West Bengal, India.741159. The subdivision is administered by SDM/SDO(Ranaghat).

Overview
Nadia district is part of the large alluvial plain formed by the Ganges-Bhagirathi system. The plains spread southwards from the head of the delta. The Ranaghat subdivision has the Bhagirathi on the west, with Purba Bardhaman and Hooghly districts lying across the river. Topographically, Ranaghat subdivision is spread across the Krishnanagar-Santipur Plain, which occupies the central part of the district, and the Ranaghat-Chakdaha Plain, the low-lying area found in the south-eastern part of the district. The Churni separates the two plains. The area slopes southwards. A portion of the east forms the boundary with Bangladesh. The area had large forests. The huge influx of East Bengali refugees that took place in the district immediately after the partition of India and the steady influx ever since paved way for conversion of forest into agricultural land.

Subdivisions
Nadia district is divided into the following administrative subdivisions:

Administrative units
Ranaghat subdivision has 6 police stations, 4 community development blocks, 4 panchayat samitis, 47 gram panchayats, 327 mouzas, 293 inhabited villages 3 municipalities, 2 notified areas, 23 census towns and 5 outgrowth. The municipalities are: Ranaghat, Santipur and Birnagar. The notified areas are: Taherpur and Cooper's Camp. The census towns are: Nrisinghapur, Harinadibhastsala, Ghoralia, Beharia, Phulia, Bagula, Badkulla, Patuli, Gangni, Kamgachhi, Raghabpur, Panpara, Aistala, Satigachha, Anulia, Gopalpur, Parbbatipur, Halalpur Krishnapur, Hijuli, Ranaghat (CT), Nasra, Gangnapur and Belgharia. Outgrowths around Ranaghat are: Taherpur (Ward No. 14), Barasat (Ward No, 15), Bhaduri (Ward No. 16), Mahisdanga (Ward No.17) and Magurkhali (Ward No. 13).

The subdivision has its headquarters at Ranaghat.

Police stations
Police stations in Ranaghat subdivision have the following features and jurisdiction:

Blocks
Community development blocks in Ranaghat subdivision are:

Gram Panchayats
The subdivision contains 47 gram panchayats under 4 community development blocks:

Hanskhali block consists of 13 gram panchayats, viz. Bagula;I, Betna Gobindapur, Mamjoan, Ramnagar Barachupria;I, Bagula;II, Dakshinpara&;I, Mayurhat;I, Batkulla;I, Dakshinpara;II, Mayurhat;II, Ramnagar Barachupria;II, Batkulla;II and Gajna.

Santipur block consists of ten gram panchayats, viz. Arbandi–I, Baganchra, Fulia Township, Nabla, Arbandi–II, Belgoria–I, Gayeshpur, Babla, Belgoria–II and Haripur.

Ranaghat I block consists of ten gram panchayats, viz. Anulia, Kalinarayanpur Paharpur, Nawpara Masunda, Ramnagar–II, Barasat, Payradanga, Tarapur, Habibpur, Khisma and Ramnagar–I.

Ranaghat II block consists of 14 gram panchayats, viz. Anishmali, Baidyapur–II, Kamalpur, Raghunathpur Hijuli–II, Aranghata, Debagram, Majhergram, Bahirgachi, Duttafulia, Nokari, Raghunathpur Hijuli–I, Baidyapur–I, Jugalkishore and Shyamnagar.

Education
Nadia district had a literacy rate of 74.97% as per the provisional figures of the census of India 2011. Tehatta subdivision had a literacy rate of 67.25%, Krishnanagar Sadar subdivision 71.03%, Ranaghat subdivision 79.51% and Kalyani subdivision 83.35%.

Given in the table below (data in numbers) is a comprehensive picture of the education scenario in Nadia district for the year 2013-14:

Note: Primary schools include junior basic schools; middle schools, high schools and higher secondary schools include madrasahs; technical schools include junior technical schools, junior government polytechnics, industrial technical institutes, industrial training centres, nursing training institutes etc.; technical and professional colleges include engineering colleges, medical colleges, para-medical institutes, management colleges, teachers training and nursing training colleges, law colleges, art colleges, music colleges etc. Special and non-formal education centres include sishu siksha kendras, madhyamik siksha kendras, centres of Rabindra mukta vidyalaya, recognised Sanskrit tols, institutions for the blind and other handicapped persons, Anganwadi centres, reformatory schools etc.

The following institutions are located in Ranaghat subdivision:
Ranaghat College was established at Ranaghat in 1950. Affiliated to the University of Kalyani, it offers undergraduate courses in arts, science and commerce. It has facilities for teaching MA in Bengali.
Santipur College was established at Santipur in 1948. It came up with the initiative of Pandit Lakshmi Kanta Maitra. Affiliated to the University of Kalyani, it offers honours courses in Bengali, English, Sanskrit, history, philosophy, political science, physics, chemistry, mathematics, botany, accountancy and computer applications.
Pritilata Waddedar Mahavidyalaya was established at Panikhali in 2007. It was founded as a women's college but later became co-educational. It is a government aided general degree college.
Srikrishna College was established at Bagula in 1952.Affiliated to the University of Kalyani, it offers honours courses in Bengali, English, Sanskrit, history, geography, political science, philosophy, economics, education, physics, chemistry, mathematics and accountancy.

Healthcare
The table below (all data in numbers) presents an overview of the medical facilities available and patients treated in the hospitals, health centres and sub-centres in 2014 in Nadia district.  
 

.* Excluding nursing homes

Medical facilities
Medical facilities in Ranaghat subdivision are as follows:

Hospitals in Ranaghat subdivision: (Name, location, beds)
Ranaghat Subdivisional Hospital, Anulia, 171 beds
Santipur State General Hospital, Santipur, 131 beds
Coopers' P.L. Home and Hospital, Cooper's Camp, 30 beds

Rural Hospitals: (Name, block, location, beds) 
Bagula Rural Hospital, Hanskhali CD Block, Bagula, 30 beds
Habibpur (Jadhav Dutta) Rural Hospital, Ranaghat I CD Block, Habibpur, 30 beds
Aranghata Rural Hospital, Ranaghat II CD Block, Aranghata, 30 beds

Block Primary Health Centres: (Name, CD block, location, beds)
Nabla (Fulia) Block Primary Health Centre, Santipur CD Block, Fulia Colony, 10 beds

Primary Health Centres (CD Block-wise)(CD Block, PHC location, beds) 
Santipur CD Block: Arbandhi (10 beds), Baganchora (10 beds), Gayeshpur (10 beds)
Hanskhali CD Block: Badkulla (10 beds), Ramnagar (6 beds), Hanskhali (6 beds), Dakshinpara (10 beds)
Ranaghat I CD Block: Paschim Noapara Bhabasundari (10 beds), Paharpur (6 beds), Taherpur (6 beds).
Ranaghat II CD Block: Duttapulia (10 beds), Gangnapur (4 beds), Kamalpur (4 beds), Gangsara (4 beds)

Electoral constituencies
Lok Sabha (parliamentary) and Vidhan Sabha (state assembly) constituencies in Ranaghat subdivision were as follows:

References

Subdivisions of West Bengal
Subdivisions in Nadia district